Brahmanpara is an upazila of Comilla District in the Division of Chittagong, Bangladesh.

Geography
It has a total area of 128.9 km2.

Demographics

According to the 2011 Census of Bangladesh, Brahmanpara upazila had a population of 204,691 living in 35,068 households. It's growth rate over the decade 2001-2011 was 12.79%. Brahmanpara has a sex ratio of 1101 females per 1000 males and a literacy rate of 54.74%. 6,013 (2.94%) live in urban areas.

Administration
Brahmanpara Upazila is divided into Brahmanpara Municipality and eight union parishads: Brahmanpara, Chandla, Dulalpur, Madhabpur, Malapara, Shahebabad, Shashidal, and Shidli. The union parishads are subdivided into 53 mauzas and 65 villages.

The incumbent MP in this Thana is Abdul Matin Khasru, the former Law, Justice and parliamentary minister. The Upazila chairman is M A Zaher.

See also
Upazilas of Bangladesh
Districts of Bangladesh
Divisions of Bangladesh

References

 
Upazilas of Comilla District